The 2026 Oklahoma gubernatorial election will take place on November 3, 2026, to elect the Governor of Oklahoma. Republican Governor Kevin Stitt will be ineligible to seek another term.

Republican primary
Incumbent Governor of Oklahoma Kevin Stitt will be term-limited in 2026.

Candidates

Potential
 Cindy Byrd, Oklahoma State Auditor (2019-present)
 Gentner Drummond, Attorney General of Oklahoma (2023-present)
 Charles McCall, Speaker of the Oklahoma House of Representatives (2017-present)
 Matt Pinnell, Lieutenant Governor of Oklahoma (2019-present)
 Ryan Walters, Oklahoma Superintendent of Public Instruction (2023-present)

Democratic primary

General election

References

2026
Gubernatorial
Oklahoma